Sir Nathaniel Dunlop (1830–1919) was a 19th-century British businessman, shipowner and philanthropist, linked to the Allan Steamship Line. He was the longest serving Chairman of the Clyde Navigation Trust. He was also the first Scottish Chairman of the Chamber of Shipping of the United Kingdom.

Life

He was born in Campbeltown on 7 April 1830, the son of Archibald Dunlop and his wife Jean Smith. He was educated in the grammar school there.

He moved to Paisley in 1843 and subsequently around 1845 he moved to Glasgow to work as a clerk for Allan Line Royal Mail Steamers.
He became a manager in 1853. The most famous ship built under his control was the SS Canadian. In Glasgow he lived at 1 Montgomerie Crescent in the Kelvinside district.

In 1898 he bought the estate of Shieldhill near Biggar. He was knighted Sir Nathaniel Dunlop of Shieldhill in 1907 by King Edward VII. Glasgow University awarded him an honorary doctorate (LLD) in the same year. He did much philanthropic work in Biggar and paid for the church in Quothquan.

He died on 15 November 1919 at Shieldhill. He is buried with his in-laws in the Glasgow Necropolis. The large monument stands near the summit north of the main east-west path.

Family
He was married to Ellen Smith (1841-1867), daughter of George Smith (1777-1867), a major Glasgow shipowner. Ellen died at the birth of their only child, a daughter, Ellen Smith Dunlop (1867-1958), who continued his philanthropic work after his death.

Publications
The Canadian Trade as it Was and Is (1906)

References

1830 births
1919 deaths
People from Campbeltown
Scottish shipbuilders
Scottish philanthropists
19th-century British philanthropists
19th-century Scottish businesspeople